Algeria (ALG) competed at the 2005 Mediterranean Games in Almería, Spain, with a total number of 114 participants (84 men and 30 women).

Medals

Gold
 Judo
Men's Extra-Lightweight (– 60 kg): Omar Rebahi
Women's Extra-Lightweight (– 48 kg): Soraya Haddad
 Swimming
Men's 50m Freestyle: Salim Iles
Men's 100m Freestyle: Salim Iles

Bronze
 Boxing
Men's Lightweight (– 60 kg): Mohamed Beldjord
Men's Welterweight (– 69 kg): Choayb Oussaci
 Judo
Men's Lightweight (– 73 kg): Nourredine Yagoubi
Men's Half-Middleweight (– 81 kg): Abderahmane Benamadi
Women's Half-Lightweight (– 52 kg): Lynda Mekzine
 Swimming
Men's 100 m freestyle: Nabil Kebbab
Men's 200 m breaststroke: Sofiane Daid

Results by event
 Basketball
Men's Team Competition
 Karim Atamna
 Farid Belhimeur
 Moured Boughedir
 Sofiane Boulaya
 Ali Bouziane
 Djillali Canon
 Farouk Djillali
 Redouane Fergati
 Abdelhalim Kaouane
 Nadjim Ouali
 Tarek Oukid
 Abdelhalim Sayah
 Boxing
Men's Light Flyweight (– 48 kg)
 Hamoud Boubraouat
Men's Flyweight (– 51 kg)
 Abdelhakim Ouradi
 Preliminary Round — Lost to Artur Gavoci (ALB), 14:15
Men's Bantamweight (– 54 kg)
 Malik Bouziane
Men's Featherweight (– 57 kg)
 Hadj Belkhir
Men's Super Lightweight (– 64 kg)
 Ben Yamine Besmi
Men's Lightweight (– 60 kg)
 Mohamed Beldjord
Men's Welterweight (– 69 kg)
 Choayb Oussaci
Men's Middleweight (– 75 kg)
 Nabil Kassel
Men's Light Heavyweight (– 81 kg)
 Moh Akli Amari
 Swimming
Men's Competition
Sofiane Daid
Mehdi Hamama
Salim Iles
Nabil Kebbab
Mahrez Mebarek
Aghiles Slimani
Women's Competition
Sabrina Azzouz
Fella Bennaceur
Souad Cherouati
Sabria Faiza Dahane
Sarah Hadj Abdelrahmane
Amira Kouza
Kenza Matoub

See also
 Algeria at the 2004 Summer Olympics
 Algeria at the 2008 Summer Olympics

References

 Official Site
 swimrankings

Nations at the 2005 Mediterranean Games
2005
Mediterranean Games